Etienne Amenyido (born 1 March 1998) is a professional footballer who plays as a forward for 2. Bundesliga club FC St. Pauli. Born in Germany, he represents the Togo national team.

Club career
Amenyido made his Eredivisie debut for VVV-Venlo on 27 August 2017 in a game against AFC Ajax.

On 16 June 2021, 2. Bundesliga club FC St. Pauli announced the signing of Amenyido from relegated VfL Osnabrück.

International career
Amenyido was born in Germany to a Togolese mother and German father and has represented Germany at the 2017 UEFA European Under-19 Championship. He debuted for Togo in a friendly 1–1 draw against Sudan on 12 October 2020.

References

External links
 
 
 

1998 births
Living people
People from Herford
Sportspeople from Detmold (region)
Citizens of Togo through descent
Togolese footballers
German footballers
Footballers from North Rhine-Westphalia
Association football forwards
Togo international footballers
Germany youth international footballers
German people of Togolese descent
2. Bundesliga players
3. Liga players
Regionalliga players
Eredivisie players
Borussia Dortmund II players
VVV-Venlo players
VfL Osnabrück players
FC St. Pauli players
FC St. Pauli II players
German expatriate footballers
German expatriate sportspeople in the Netherlands
Expatriate footballers in the Netherlands